The Elisha White House, also known as Maple Tree Farm, is a historic mansion in Waco, Tennessee, U.S..

History
The land was granted to Thomas Armstrong, a veteran of the American Revolutionary War. In 1810, it was purchased by Elisha White, a settler from Virginia. White built the house in 1821, where he lived with his wife Jane. During the American Civil War of 1861–1865, it served as a hospital for the Confederate States Army.

The house has been listed on the National Register of Historic Places since March 4, 1983.

References

Houses on the National Register of Historic Places in Tennessee
Federal architecture in Tennessee
Houses completed in 1821
Antebellum architecture
Houses in Giles County, Tennessee